The selection process for the 1994 Winter Olympics consisted of four bids and saw Lillehammer, Norway, selected ahead of Östersund, Sweden; Sofia, Bulgaria; and Anchorage, Alaska, United States. The selection was made at the 94th IOC Session in Seoul, South Korea, on 15 September 1988.

Results

References

Bids
 
September 1988 events in Europe
1980s in Seoul
1988 in South Korean sport
Events in Seoul